Kulmanga is a community in Sagnarigu District in the Northern Region of Ghana.

See also
 Golinga

References 

Communities in Ghana
Suburbs of Sagnarigu District